is a Japanese term meaning "beautifully white" which was coined in the early 1900s with the emergence of skin whitening products and cosmetics. Even in ancient Japanese haiku there have been numerous references to this term.

Summary 
Although skin tone differs based on a person's racial background, those with fair skin have difficulty maintaining skin tone due to a lack of melanin production. In Japan the preference for skin that is white and free of blemishes has been documented since at least the Heian period (794–1185), as in books like The Pillow Book and The Tale of Genji. There is an old proverb , which refers to a white-skinned woman being beautiful even if her features are not attractive.

Following Japanese colonial rule in Taiwan (1895–1945), Taiwanese women were consumers of Japanese skin whitening products in the 20th century. Mainland China has also become a large market for  products from companies like Shiseido, Shu Uemura and SK-II in the 21st century. Further expansion into the pan-Asian markets may be represented by Girls' Generation partnership with Dior in 2011 to advertise their lightening cream, appealing to Korean Wave culture consumers.

 products are highly popular among mature women. An opposition to the idea of fair skin beauty grew with the  subculture called  in the 1990s which later died out by the end of the 2000s.

Lightening methods 
Traditionally,  was used to lighten skin tone, although today it is considered a luxury item. The most popular products often contain  and rice bran, which contain kojic acid.

For skin whitening cosmetics for use by the public, the Ministry of Health, Labour and Welfare has recognized a combination of active ingredients. These are mainly arbutin and kojic acid. Other ingredients include vitamin C derivatives and tranexamic acid. Many of these active ingredients work through inhibiting  catechol oxidase. Some types of BB cream, VIORIS products are also said to have skin whitening effects, which contributes to the popularity of the cream in Asian markets.

See also

 Skin whitening
 K-beauty

Notes

References

Asian culture
Beauty
Discrimination based on skin color
Cosmetics
Light skin
Japanese culture
Japanese fashion